Private Secretary (also known as Susie) is an American sitcom that aired from February 1, 1953, to September 10, 1957, on CBS, alternating with The Jack Benny Program on Sundays at 7:30pm EST. The series stars Ann Sothern as Susan Camille "Susie" MacNamara, devoted secretary to handsome talent agent Peter Sands, played by Don Porter.

Overview
Susie MacNamara (Sothern) is a former stage actress, a WAC veteran of World War II and single woman who works as the private secretary for theatrical agent Peter Sands (Porter) at the fictional New York theatrical agency International Artists Inc. Susie's honest, good-natured attempts to help Mr. Sands, especially in romantic matters, always leads to comedic complications. Susie is usually assisted by her best friend, Violet "Vi" Praskins (Ann Tyrrell), the office's nervous and bumbling receptionist. In guest appearances, Jesse White played Mickey "Cagey" Calhoun, a chief competitor and loudmouthed agent business rival to Susie's boss. One of the show's trademarks was the set decoration portraying a 1950s state-of-the-art executive office, with stylish decor, IBM typewriters and the latest office telephone gear from Western Electric. There are occasional references to a young actress, never seen, who was a client of Mr. Sands named Harriet Lake (Sothern's real name).

In an unusual move, Private Secretary also had two brief runs on another network. During the summers of 1953 and 1954, reruns from the recent season were shown on NBC as a summer replacement for Your Hit Parade, with the series resuming new shows on CBS each fall. Private Secretary, Your Hit Parade and The Jack Benny Program were all sponsored by Lucky Strike Cigarettes. Its parent company American Tobacco Company had some financial interest in all three programs and their respective network time-slots.

Series ending

The series was renewed for a sixth season, but Sothern walked out in a contract dispute with producer Jack Chertok, ending the series' run. Sothern, along with several cast members, went on to star in another weekly series, The Ann Sothern Show, from 1958–1961.

Sothern reprised the character of Susie MacNamara for the premiere episode of The Lucille Ball-Desi Arnaz Show (later shown in repeats as The Lucy-Desi Comedy Hour). In this installment, entitled "Lucy Takes a Cruise to Havana" (which was originally a 75-minute episode), Sothern appeared opposite series regulars Lucille Ball, Desi Arnaz, Vivian Vance, William Frawley and Richard Keith as well as guest stars Hedda Hopper, Rudy Vallee and Cesar Romero.

Episodes

Release

Syndication 
Before Private Secretary went into syndication, the opening title sequence and series name were changed. The series, which was sponsored by American Tobacco for Lucky Strike cigarettes during its original run, featured the company’s sponsor I.D. in the opening title sequence which could not be aired in syndication. An animated title sequence was made featuring a cartoon "Susie."

The series' name was also changed when producer Jack Chertok withheld the rights to the show's original title in hopes of replacing Sothern with another actress in the title role. Chertok released Susie into syndication in the fall of 1957. The original title sequence has not been viewed since Private Secretary's original run.

Susie aired on Nick at Nite from January 1987 to June 1990.

Home media 
In 2006, two video distributors, Critics' Choice and Alpha Video, released one volume of the series on Region 1 DVD in the United States. Both releases were identical with the exception of the artwork. Both companies released three more identical volumes. The latest, volume four, was released in April 2007. Each volume contains four episodes of the series from varying seasons.

Reception

Nielsen ratings 
 Season 1: N/A
 Season 2: #24
 Season 3: #19
 Season 4: #12
 Season 5: #25

Award nominations

References

External links

Public domain episode at Internet Archive

1953 American television series debuts
1957 American television series endings
1950s American sitcoms
Black-and-white American television shows
Private Secretary
English-language television shows
Television shows set in New York City